Diophantus is a lunar impact crater that lies in the southwestern part of the Mare Imbrium. It was named after ancient Greek mathematician Diophantus. It forms a pair with the larger crater Delisle to the north. Diophantus has a wide inner wall and a low central rise. To the north of Diophantus is the sinuous rille designated Rima Diophantus, named after the crater. Diophantus C lies near the exterior of the southwest wall.

Rima Diophantus
This cleft follows a generally east–west path across the Mare Imbrium. It is centered at selenographic coordinates 31.0° N, 32.0° W, and has a maximum diameter of 150 km.

Small craters
Several tiny craters north of Diophantus have been assigned names by the IAU. These are listed in the table below.

The crater Samir has bright rays that extend for over 70 km.

Satellite craters
By convention these features are identified on lunar maps by placing the letter on the side of the crater midpoint that is closest to Diophantus.

The following craters have been renamed by the IAU.

 Diophantus A — See Artsimovich.

References

External links

 LTO-39B3 Diophantus — L&PI topographic map of crater and vicinity.

Impact craters on the Moon
Mare Imbrium